William Allen Cullop (March 28, 1853 – October 9, 1927) was an American lawyer, educator, and politician who served four terms as a U.S. Representative from Indiana from 1909 to 1917.

Biography 
Born near Oaktown, Indiana, Cullop attended the common schools.
He was graduated from Hanover College in June 1878.
Professor for two years in Vincennes (Indiana) University.
He studied law.
He was admitted to the bar in 1881 and commenced practice in Vincennes, Indiana.
He served as prosecuting attorney of the twelfth judicial circuit 1883-1886.
He served as member of the State house of representatives 1891-1893.
He served as delegate to the Democratic National Conventions in 1892 and 1896.

Congress 
Cullop was elected as a Democrat to the Sixty-first and to the three succeeding Congresses (March 4, 1909 – March 3, 1917).
He was an unsuccessful candidate for renomination in 1916.
He was an unsuccessful candidate for the Democratic nomination as United States Senator in 1926.

Later career and death 
He resumed the practice of law and was also interested in various business enterprises.
He died in Vincennes, Indiana, October 9, 1927.
He was interred in Greenlawn Cemetery.

References

1853 births
1927 deaths
Hanover College alumni
People from Vincennes, Indiana
Democratic Party members of the United States House of Representatives from Indiana
Democratic Party members of the Indiana House of Representatives